Divya Sathyaraj is an Indian nutritionist. She is the daughter of actor Sathyaraj and sister of Sibi. Divya is the goodwill ambassador of The Akshaya Patra Foundation (TAPF), an NGO implementing the Government of India’s Midday Meal Scheme for school children. She has also started a movement in 2020, Mahilmadhi Iyakkam, an initiative to provide healthy and nutritious meals to the malnourished and under-privileged communities, free of cost.

Personal life 
Divya is the daughter of actor Sathyaraj and Maheshwari. Divya's brother is actor Sibi. Unlike her father and brother, Divya abstained from acting, instead pursuing a career in nutrition. Originally a vegetarian, she became a vegan in 2016.

Career 
Divya graduated with a Master of Philosophy in Nutrition from the University of Madras. She conducts workshops on health-related issues, child labour and self-defence for women, and counseling sessions for Sri Lankan refugees. She had written a letter to the Prime Minister of India, Narendra Modi, pointing out the malpractices and negligence in medical field and questioning the NEET exams. She is the goodwill ambassador of Akshaya Patra Foundation, the world's largest midday meal programme. She has also partnered with World Vision India, where she has assumed responsibility for four young girls.

Divya started a movement in 2020, Mahilmadhi Iyakkam. About the movement she says, "The purpose of the movement is to identify areas in the city where access to nutritious food and awareness about its benefits are lacking. Once the areas are identified and the community members are assessed, those in the neighbourhood who are in need, will be provided hygienic and healthy food, free of cost, based on the deficiencies." Divya will get into politics in 2021.

Awards 
In 2019, Divya received the Women Achiever Award for excellence in community service from Raindrops, a youth-based social organisation spreading social awareness through media and entertainment. In 2020, she was awarded an honorary doctorate by the International Tamil University, USA, in recognition for her contributions in the field of Nutritional therapy.

References 

Indian nutritionists
Living people
People from Tamil Nadu
Year of birth missing (living people)